Hibiscus House may refer to:

Hibiscus Children's Center - Florida
Hibiscus House Gambia - The Gambia